The 2021 Mongolian National Premier League was the 53rd season of the Mongolian National Premier League. The season began on 1 August and ended on 3 October 2021. This is the first year without sponsorship Mazala after three years of partnership.

Teams

League table

Matches

Round 1

Round 2

Round 3

Round 4

Round 5

Round 6

Round 7

Round 8

Round 9

Round 10

Top goalscorer

References

External links
 Mongolian Premier League summary (SOCCERWAY)

Mongolia Premier League seasons
Mongolia